The fictional superheroine Supergirl has been adapted into pop culture several times since 1984. This includes a feature film and several animated and live-action television programs.

Film

Supergirl (1984)

A feature film adaptation Supergirl was released in 1984, starring Helen Slater in her first motion picture role. Supergirl was a spin-off from the popular 1978 film Superman, and Marc McClure reprises his role of Jimmy Olsen. The film performed poorly at the box office and failed to impress critics or audiences; Peter O'Toole received a Golden Raspberry Award nomination for Worst Actor for his performance, while Faye Dunaway received a Worst Actress nomination for hers. Prior to its release, Supergirl was expected to be the first film of a series, and Helen Slater had a contract for three films, but Supergirls failure at the box office cancelled plans for a Supergirl II.

Superman III
Supergirl was originally planned for Superman III, in a treatment written by Ilya Salkind. In a bizarre twist from the comics, Supergirl was to be the surrogate daughter of Brainiac (who later is possessively in love with her) who falls in love with Superman, who in the film was to be portrayed as her lover instead of cousin, contrary to all previous depictions.

Movie 43
Kristen Bell parodies Supergirl in a comedy segment of Movie 43.

DC Extended Universe
A reference of Kara Zor-El is seen in Man of Steel where Clark sees one space pod open in the Fortress of Solitude.

A Supergirl film centered around Kara Zor-El / Supergirl, was announced to be in development with Oren Uziel penning the script. The studio intends to hire a female director, with Reed Morano—who has expressed interest in the project—being its top choice. Filming was expected to start production in early 2020.

The Flash director Andy Muschietti announced that Supergirl will make her debut in the film with Sasha Calle portraying Kara.

DC Universe
In January 2023, James Gunn announced a standalone film featuring the character Kara Zor-El / Supergirl, which would derive significantly from the Supergirl: Woman of Tomorrow (2021–22) miniseries by writer Tom King and artist Bilquis Evely.

Television

Super Friends

Although not appearing in the show, she did appear in some of the related comics with the show.

DC Animated Universe

Superman: The Animated Series

Supergirl first appears, voiced by Nicholle Tom, in the two-part Superman: The Animated Series episode "Little Girl Lost" as Kara In-Ze''' from Krypton's "sister world" of Argos. The character is depicted as a headstrong and independent teenage girl who was placed in suspended animation before the conditions on Argos became inhospitable.

Season Two was extended an extra two episodes solely to accommodate a story with Supergirl; producer Bruce Timm said, "We actually had to steal two episodes from 'Batman'. They had a Supergirl toy coming from Kenner, so they allowed us to do those [episodes]." Bruce Timm and Paul Dini intended to use the original Supergirl, Kara Zor-El, but were denied by DC Comics, due to DC's then-present edict that Superman was to remain the only surviving Kryptonian."We wanted a take on her that was not the current version, (where she was) some sort of alien who is combined with a human girl and is all confused and angst-ridden, and we didn’t want to do the blob of protoplasm that takes the shape of Supergirl’s form. We wanted to do the original version, which is Superman’s cousin from Krypton. We ran into a wall with DC because they insisted that Superman be the last Kryptonian. So we did a compromise: she’s from a small planet in the neighboring system that was colonized by Kryptonians, but they’ve evolved slightly differently. -- Paul Dini, The Justice League Watchtower: Supergirl.  Retrieved on 14 September 2008.

The daughter of planetary chief physician Kala In-Ze (In-Ze was the last name of Kara Zor-El's mother Allura), Kara was the only survivor of her world, the rest having died when their suspended animation units suffered damage over time. While on a space exploration trip, Superman discovers Argos and consequently Kara. Clark arranges for the Kents to take Kara in while she adjusts to life on Earth, and upon visiting Clark in Metropolis, she wears glasses and a brunette wig with a ponytail to pose as Clark's cousin Kara Kent. This Supergirl shares Superman's vulnerability to kryptonite (except in the comic book adaptation of the series, which also affects other Argonians); she also suffers from cheimatophobia (fear of cold), due to her experiences prior to her time in suspended animation. Kara is written as eager to take up a position at the right hand of Superman, but Superman thinks she is too young and unready, despite the fact that she and Jimmy Olsen, who struck up a friendship at once, were critical in ferreting out an early connection between Intergang and Granny Goodness. Kara becomes friends with Batgirl in The New Batman Adventures episode "Girls' Night Out", though their meeting is played for laughs and the girls depicted as somewhat inept.

She has a red, white and blue costume. She continues to use that same costume in her first appearance in the first episode of Justice League Unlimited, where Nicholle Tom reprises her voice-acting role. In the third season of JLU, Supergirl appears in a new outfit, the more traditional blue shirt with red miniskirt that resembles Kara Zor-El's post-Crisis costume. Additionally, she becomes an excellent hand-to-hand combatant, having trained in various forms of unarmed fighting.

Justice League
In "Hereafter", Kara makes a cameo appearance at Superman's funeral, alongside Jonathan and Martha Kent. Additionally, in "Comfort and Joy", she appears in a photograph, and is mentioned to be away from home skiing with Barbara Gordon.

Justice League Unlimited
It is revealed that scientists from Project Cadmus created Galatea, an evil clone of Kara, for nefarious purposes. The clone is a more mature version of Kara, and in appearance and costume is a homage to Power Girl. Kara, accompanied by Green Arrow and Question travel to S.T.A.R. Labs to investigate. From this episode on, Green Arrow becomes a sort of father figure to Kara and frequently discusses her with Superman. In the episode "Far From Home", Green Arrow tells Superman that he and Black Canary planned on bringing Supergirl out to celebrate her twenty-first birthday. With the re-introduction of Kara Zor-El to regular DC continuity, she is also referred to once again as Superman's cousin, but as an adoptive one.

In the episode "Chaos at the Earth's Core", Supergirl has a new costume with a blue shirt and red skirt. This color scheme resembles Superman's costume palette.

In "Far From Home", Supergirl, along with Green Lantern and Green Arrow, encounters Legion of Super-Heroes members Brainiac 5 and Bouncing Boy. They have brought the three modern heroes to the 31st century to aid them in defeating the Fatal Five, who have mind controlled the Legion. However, Brainiac 5 tells Green Lantern and Green Arrow that 30th century history says that Supergirl never returned to her own time; Brainiac 5 and Bouncing Boy assume this indicates that she will die while on this mission. As Kara experiences the technology and society of the 30th century, which is similar to that of her lost homeworld, she becomes more and more conflicted about returning to the past, where she has never felt that she fits in. Finally, she and Brainiac 5 develop romantic feelings for each other, and when Green Lantern and Green Arrow prepare to return to the past, she tells them that history will be fulfilled since she is staying in the future as a member of the Legion.

Supergirl also appears in the Justice League Unlimited tie-in comics. This version apparently remains in the 21st century, as she is still part of the Justice League (wearing her original costume) after Huntress is allowed back into the League (which doesn't happen during the show's run).

Smallville Legends: Kara and the Chronicles of KryptonKara and the Chronicles of Krypton will be the fourth set of videos of the Smallville Legends web series. In these animated shorts, we see Kara during the Kryptonian Civil War which led eventually to her planet's destruction. She is the daughter of Zor-El and lives in the city of Kandor in contrast to previous versions of the character that lived in Argo. Zor-El is a prominent figure in the war and so Kara is in the middle of the chaos. The webisodes are featured on the Smallville Complete Season 7 DVD set as a bonus feature.

Justice League: The New Frontier
Supergirl also appears in a brief background cameo appearance in the direct-to-video animated film Justice League: The New Frontier. She is seen during the famous speech made by John F. Kennedy along with many other characters just before the closing credits.

Superman/Batman Apocalypse
Kara Zor-El appears in Superman/Batman: Apocalypse, voiced by Summer Glau. The film depicts her arrival on Earth and adjustment to life on the new planet. During the film, she is kidnapped and brainwashed by Darkseid before Superman frees her and takes her back to Earth.

Super Best Friends Forever

Supergirl appears alongside Batgirl and Wonder Girl in Super Best Friends Forever, a series of shorts developed by Lauren Faust for the DC Nation block on Cartoon Network. She is voiced by Nicole Sullivan.

Superman: Unbound
Molly C. Quinn voices Supergirl in Superman: Unbound, an adaptation of Superman: Brainiac. Kara and her parents narrowly escaped Kandor before it was shrunken and abducted by Brainiac, leaving her with PTSD. She arrived on Earth a few months before the film's beginning and is still adjusting to life on Earth and her baby cousin being older than her due to the difference in how long their rockets spent in space. Kara prefers to use her powers to save people from dictators rather than fight ordinary criminals. Kara is greatly reluctant to face Brainiac again, even with super powers, but eventually summons the courage to help her cousin fight him.

DC Super Hero Girls
Supergirl appears as a central protagonist in the web series DC Super Hero Girls, voiced by Anais Fairweather. This version is a student at Super Hero High.

She also appears a central protagonist in the 2019 TV series, with Nicole Sullivan reprising her role from the Super Best Friends Forever shorts.

Lego DC Comics Super Heroes: Justice League: Cosmic Clash
Supergirl appears as a new member of the Justice League in the animated film Lego DC Comics Super Heroes: Justice League: Cosmic Clash, voiced by Jessica DiCicco.

Justice League Action
Supergirl appears in Justice League Action, voiced by Joanne Spracklen.

Teen Titans Go! To the Movies
Supergirl appears in Teen Titans Go! To the Movies, voiced by Meredith Salenger. She is at the superhero film premiere wearing Plastic Man as a dress.

Live action

Smallville
A girl calling herself Kara (played by Adrianne Palicki) appears in the Smallville episode "Covenant", claiming to be from Krypton, although she does not call herself Supergirl or Kara Zor-El or even claim to be Kal-El's cousin. When Lana Lang asked who she was, Clark Kent claimed she was a visiting cousin. She was revealed at episode's end to be Lindsey Harrison, a human empowered and controlled by Kryptonian technology as part of Jor-El's plan to influence Clark.

The actual Supergirl character appears in the program's seventh season, beginning with the season premiere. She is played by actress Laura Vandervoort. Kara was sent from Krypton at the same time as was Kal-El to look after him, but was trapped under a dam during the first meteor shower and was in suspended animation for the past 18 years. After the dam is broken, Kara Zor-El is freed. As the daughter of Zor-El, she is Clark's Kryptonian cousin, and hence possesses the same powers. Though she has also mastered flight, she, like her comic book counterpart, lacks the control Clark has developed over his years of dealing with humans. For example, she is unaware of the more subtle super-hearing until taught to use it by Clark. Though chronologically older than Clark (she was sixteen years old at the time of Clark's birth), her time in suspended animation leaves her with the appearance of a girl in her mid-to-late teens.

Kara explains that Clark was not made aware of her existence because their respective fathers were not on good terms, exemplified by Jor-El's distrust when informed of her arrival by Clark. The Martian Manhunter AKA John Jones is similarly distrustful of her, as Kara is of him, claiming that Zor-El attempted to have Jor-El assassinated. In the episode "Lara", it is revealed the Martian Manhunter was correct about her father. Zor-El had tried to kill his brother out of the love he had for Jor-El's wife, Lara. Kara witnessed an incident where Zor-El attempted to force Lara to leave Jor-El and love him. Zor-El had erased her memories, causing her to believe he was a good man until now. Realizing she was wrong about her father, she puts her memories of him aside and remains with Clark on the farm. At the end of the episode "Blue", when a double of Zor-El is defeated, Kara is involuntarily teleported to Detroit with a case of amnesia.

After being taken in by a waitress, she works at a diner for several weeks, and eventually takes on the name of "Linda." Her memories and powers remain mysteriously gone, as Clark brings her back to Smallville. However, he decides to hide her Kryptonian identity from her, hiding her Kryptonian bracelet. Because of this, by the episode "Hero" she becomes drawn to Lex, moving in with him, because of Clark and Lana's secrecy.

In the episode "Traveler", Kara's memory and powers are restored by Jor-El making her able to save Clark, who was imprisoned in a Kryptonite cell. In the following episode, entitled "Veritas", Kara attempts to teach Clark how to fly so as to further his chances of surviving a confrontation with the newly restored Brainiac. When Kara resists Brainiac's offer of help in restoring Krypton, Lana falls victim to Brainiac's brain-probe. This, in turn, prompts Kara to voluntarily travel into space with Brainiac, and she is last seen entering hyperspace high above Earth. In the seventeenth episode titled "Sleeper", Kara is discovered to be on Krypton, in the year 1986. In the episode 18, "Apocalypse", we see Kara on an alternative universe where Kal-El never made it to Earth. Kara was found and raised by Lex and Lionel Luthor, and took on the name Linda Danvers, being head of DDS (Department of Domestic Security). There, when she finds Clark from the original Smallville universe, she reveals that was sent to Earth to kill him. Back in the year 1986, Kara is fighting Brainiac, when she is helped by Clark, destroys Brainiac, and make it to Earth again.

It is finally discovered in the season finale "Arctic", that the real Kara never made it back to Earth and is trapped in the Phantom Zone, and that Brainiac had been impersonating her. In episode 8 of season 8, "Bloodline", Clark and Lois are transported into the Phantom Zone where they are mistakenly attacked by Kara. She later reveals a portal that can allow one to exit the Phantom Zone but she has not done so, fearing the escape of other prisoners. She activates the portal to allow Clark and Lois back but both she and Clark are defeated by Faora, General Zod's wife. With Chloe's help, they make it back to Smallville where Kara helps Clark defeat Faora by using the Martian Manhunter's crystal to separate Faora from Lois Lane's body. In the end, she leaves Smallville, flying into space, where she has gone to look for Kandor after hearing rumors of its survival of the destruction of Krypton.

She appears again in the season 10 episode entitled "Supergirl" where she disguises herself as a hero. Later in the episode, she helps Clark by repelling Darkseid and later puts on glasses and a wig to protect her identity. In Episode 20 of that season Jor-El tells Kara she must disappear from this time period, since it must be Kal-El's time only. Reluctantly Kara puts on a Legion ring and goes to the 31st century, never really saying good bye to Clark.

Arrowverse

By September 2014, Warner Bros. Television was looking to create a television series centered around Supergirl. Executive producers for the series include Greg Berlanti (also a creator/producer for Arrow and The Flash), Ali Adler, who are both writing the script, and Berlanti Productions' Sarah Schechter. DC Comics’ Geoff Johns is also expected to be part of the project. Titles under consideration for the series included Super and Girl. Berlanti confirmed the show shortly after, and stated it was in development and had yet to be pitched to networks. On September 19, it was announced that CBS had landed the series Supergirl with a series commitment. The series will see a 24-year-old Kara Zor-El come out of hiding to become a superhero. The series follows Kara Zor-El, who is taken in by the Danvers family when she was 12, after being sent away from Krypton. The Danvers teach her to be careful with her powers, until she has to reveal them during an unexpected disaster, setting her on her journey of heroism. In November 2014, Berlanti stated that the series could also exist in the same universe as Arrow and The Flash. In January 2015, it was announced that Melissa Benoist was cast as Supergirl.

In the series, initially set on Earth-38 in the multiverse as depicted in the Arrowverse, Kara was sent to Earth to protect her cousin, Kal-El. But Krypton's explosion knocked her ship off course into the Phantom Zone, remaining in stasis for twenty years while remaining her age until she reached Earth and was found by a full-grown Kal-El - know publicly as Superman. Kara spends her remaining her teenage years with the Danvers family at Superman's suggestion, deciding to live a normal life while she and her adapted sister Alex move to National City. However, Kara was forced to reveal herself to save an crashing airplane and was later recruited by the Department of Extra-Normal Operations, a secret agency Alex works for. Kara helps the DEO chase down a number of alien criminals that Kara inadvertently helped escaped the Phantom Zone and later threats that include CADMUS, a Daxamite invasion, Reign, and Lex Luthor.

Benoist first appears outside her series in the second season of The Flash, later returning in the Arrowverse's 2016 multi-series crossover Invasion!. When the Arrowverse Earth-1 is attacked by the alien Dominators, Barry Allen recruits to Kara to help him and his Earth's heroes in opposing the invasion. After the battle concludes, Kara is given a device by Cisco Ramon that will allow her to travel back and forth to Earth-1, as well as call the other heroes for assistance if required.

Kara also plays a key role in the 2017 multi-show crossover Crisis on Earth-X, attends Barry and Iris's wedding before the group are attacked by Nazi soldiers from Earth-X under the command of that reality's Oliver Queen with support from Eobard Thawne. The Earth-X Oliver Queen seeks to capture Kara to transplant her heart into his wife and Kara's Earth-X counterpart, 'Overgirl', as she is dying from unintentionally overloading herself with solar energy. But Kara manages to escape being operated and participate in the final battle Earth-1's heroes and Earth-Xs' forces, taking Overgirl into the upper atmosphere as she was about to detonate in a nuclear-level explosion. Kara later returns in the later multi-show crossovers Elseworlds and Crisis on Infinite Earths, with her Earth-38 incorporated into Earth-Prime at the end of the latter.

Video games

Justice League Heroes
Supergirl first appeared in the PSP version of Justice League Heroes as an unlockable character, voiced by Tara Strong.

DC Universe Online
Supergirl appears in the DC Universe Online video game, voiced by Adrienne Mishler.

Lego Batman 2: DC Super Heroes
Supergirl appears as a playable character in Lego Batman 2: DC Super Heroes, voiced by Bridget Hoffman.

Injustice: Gods Among Us
Supergirl makes a cameo appearance in the IOS version of Injustice: Gods Among Us as a support card.

Lego Batman 3: Beyond Gotham
Supergirl appears as a playable character in Lego Batman 3: Beyond Gotham, voiced by Kari Wahlgren.

Infinite Crisis
Supergirl appears as a playable character in Infinite Crisis, voiced by Camilla Luddington, with the Arcane Supergirl voiced by India de Beaufort.

Injustice 2
Supergirl appears as a playable character in Injustice 2, voiced by Laura Bailey. In the story, her escape pod is retrieved by Black Adam after the events of the first game. She is trained by Black Adam and Wonder Woman into perfecting her powers as they tell her stories of her cousin, inspiring her to become Supergirl. After the Regime and Insurgency ally with each other to take out Brainiac (who was responsible for Krypton's destruction), Kara discovers what the Regime has truly done on the planet and is appalled by her cousin's actions. She and Batman infiltrate Brainiac's ship to stop the tyrant, and when Batman and Superman argue with each other over the Brainiac's fate, she allies herself with Batman, believing that her cousin is behaving more like General Zod than Jor-El. She is also the last opponent defeated by Superman before Batman. She appears in both of the game's endings, where she will either become a part of Batman's Justice League to recapture what her cousin stood for before Lois' death, or will be imprisoned by Superman until she becomes a part of his Regime. In her single player ending, she works with the Justice League to revive the Kryptonian civilizations of Argo City and Kandor.

Lego Dimensions
Supergirl appears as a playable character in Lego Dimensions via a limited-distribution minifigure, with Kari Wahlgren reprising her role.

Lego DC Super-Villains
Supergirl appears as a playable character in the DC TV Super-Heroes DLC pack in Lego DC Super-Villains.

Music
 The song "That's Really Super, Supergirl" appears on the alternative rock/psychedelic band XTC's album Skylarking (1986, Geffen Records).
 Pop singer Krystal Harris sings a song "Supergirl" that appears on the soundtrack of the Disney film The Princess Diaries.
 Pop singer Jessica Simpson's song "With You" includes the lyrics, "I wish I could save the world, like I was Supergirl!".
 Saving Jane released an album, SuperGirl, which included a song of the same name in 2008.
 The song "Supergirl" is written by Robbie Gennet. John Cougar Mellencamp, Hilary Duff, Reamonn and Papaya have also recorded different songs called "Supergirl". The Gin Blossoms recorded a song titled "Super Girl" for their 2006 album Major Lodge Victory. Multiple references are made to flight and other super powers.
 The song "Super Sexy Woman", appearing on the 2000 album A Sun Came by Sufjan Stevens, is about Supergirl, explicitly referencing "Superman's cousin."
 The musician Donovan recorded a song called "Superlungs (My Supergirl)". It appears on the album Barabajagal, as well as in alternate version bonus tracks on the remastered CD releases of Sunshine Superman and Mellow Yellow.
 "Supergirl" is a pop song recorded by Hilary Duff for her fourth album, Most Wanted'' (2005). It is exclusive to the Collector's Edition of the album and was released as the third single in 2006 in the United States, and was written by Kara DioGuardi and Greg Wells.
 "Supergirl" is the name of a song and album released by pop/R&B singer Angela Via in 2007.
 Norwegian rock band Minor Majority have a song named "Supergirl".
 In the song "Superman" by Stereophonics, the lyrics "... so you can sleep with a teenage blonde" can be heard, referencing Supergirl in the comic books.
 Christina Aguilera's song "Keeps Getting Better" contains the lyrics "Next day I'm your Supergirl out to save the world" as part of the chorus.
 "Supergirl" is Suzie McNeil's 4th single from her album Rock-n-Roller released in 2009.
 Graham Bonney had a hit in the UK, Germany and elsewhere with "Supergirl" in 1966.

Literature
In Larry Niven's essay "Man of Steel, Woman of Kleenex", he speculated on Supergirl being used as the surrogate mother for a child of Superman and Lois Lane to preserve the Kryptonian race.

References

External links
 www.dccomics.com

Supergirl